Cold River may refer to:

Streams
Cold River (Maine–New Hampshire), a tributary of the Saco River
Cold River (Bearcamp River tributary), a tributary of the Bearcamp River in New Hampshire
Cold River (Connecticut River tributary), a tributary of the Connecticut River in New Hampshire
Cold River (New York), a tributary of the Raquette River
Cold River (Vermont), a tributary of Otter Creek
Cold River (Saskatchewan), a tributary of Beaver River in Saskatchewan, Canada

Other
"Cold River", a song by a-ha from their 1990 album East of the Sun, West of the Moon

See also 
 Coldwater River (disambiguation)
 Cold (disambiguation)